The Cape dory, Cape Dory, or Cape John Dory (Zeus capensis) is a fish of the family Zeidae. It occurs on the coast of Namibia, South Africa, and Mozambique in South Atlantic and Western Indian Oceans. It is a demersal fish that lives at the depth 35–400 m. It can reach up to 90.0 cm in total length.

Cape dory is a good food fish often caught as by-catch in hake fisheries.

References

External links

Zeus (fish)
Fish of the Atlantic Ocean
Fish of the Indian Ocean
Fish of Mozambique
Marine fish of South Africa
Fish described in 1835
Taxa named by Achille Valenciennes